The Cheer Leader is a 1928 American silent drama film directed by Alan James and starring Ralph Graves, Gertrude Olmstead and Shirley Palmer.

Cast
 Ralph Graves as Jimmy Grant 
 Gertrude Olmstead as Jean Howard 
 Shirley Palmer as Elizabeth Summers 
 Ralph Emerson as Alfred Crandall 
 Harold Goodwin as Richard Crosby 
 Donald Stuart as Percival Spivins 
 Duke Martin as Chuck Casey 
 Harry Northrup as John Crandall 
 Ruth Cherrington as Mrs. Crandall 
 James Leonard as James Grant Sr 
 Lillian Langdon as Mrs. Grant 
 Bobby Nelson as Chester Grant 
 Charles North as Dean Sherwood

References

Bibliography
 Wiley Lee Umphlett. The Movies Go to College: Hollywood and the World of the College-life Film. Fairleigh Dickinson Univ Press, 1984.

External links
 

1928 films
1928 drama films
1920s English-language films
American silent feature films
Silent American drama films
Films directed by Alan James
American black-and-white films
Films set in universities and colleges
Gotham Pictures films
1920s American films